John Frederick Hawksworth (born 27 March 1961) is a retired professional golfer who played on the European Tour between 1986 and 2000.

Hawksworth had a successful amateur career during which he won the Lytham Trophy in 1984. He was a member of the Great Britain and Ireland team in the 1985 Walker Cup alongside Colin Montgomerie and David Gilford, after which he turned professional. He did not go on to enjoy the same success as a professional as his former teammates, revisiting the European Tour's qualifying school on many occasions where he only twice managed to regain full playing rights.

Since retiring from tournament golf in 2000, Hawksworth has been a regular commentator on UK television, appearing for both the BBC and Sky Sports, and on the radio with Talk Sport Radio.

Amateur wins
1984 Lytham Trophy

Professional wins
1987 Peugeot Talbot PGA Assistants' Championship

Results in major championships

Note: Hawksworth only played in The Open Championship.

CUT = missed the half-way cut
"T" = tied

Team appearances
European Amateur Team Championship (representing England): 1985
Walker Cup (representing Great Britain & Ireland): 1985
St Andrews Trophy (representing Great Britain & Ireland): 1984 (winners)

References

External links

English male golfers
European Tour golfers
1961 births
Living people